Scurry is a town in Kaufman County, Texas, United States. It was incorporated in 2003. As of the 2010 census, it had a population of 681.

Scurry is named after Scurry Dean. The arrival of the Texas and Pacific Railway in the 1870s established the settlement as a shipment point for area farmers. When local residents requested a post office, they submitted the name Scurry – in honor of Scurry Dean, who was killed during the Civil War.  Post service began in 1883 and a year later, Scurry had an estimated population of fifty.

Geography

Scurry is located at  (32.518611, –96.380833).

Climate

The climate in this area is characterized by hot, humid summers and generally mild to cool winters.  According to the Köppen climate classification, Scurry has a humid subtropical climate, Cfa on climate maps.

History

The first settlers in the area arrived in the mid-1840s. Over the next quarter century, a church and school community developed and the number of farms increased. The arrival of the Texas and Pacific Railway in the 1870s established the settlement as a shipment point for area farmers. When local residents requested a post office, they submitted the name "Scurry"—in honor of Scurry Dean, who was killed during the Civil War. Postal service began in 1883, and a year later, Scurry had an estimated population of 50. By 1914, the community was home to around 400 people and a number of businesses. The Great Depression caused Scurry to decline, which lasted through the first decade after World War II. Only 250 people remained in the community by the mid-1950s. The trend was reversed during the latter half of the 20th century. In 1990, 9 businesses and about 315 people were living in the community. That figure approached 600 by 2000, and Scurry was officially incorporated as a town three years later.

Demographics

Education
Public education in the town of Scurry is provided by the Scurry-Rosser Independent School District. The district has three campuses and also serves the incorporated communities of Rosser, Cottonwood, and Grays Prairie in southwestern Kaufman County.

References

External links

Scurry, Texas – Texas Handbook Online
Scurry-Rosser Independent School District

Towns in Kaufman County, Texas
Towns in Texas
Dallas–Fort Worth metroplex
Populated places established in the 1870s